Louis De Pui "Bucker" Vail (September 18, 1870 – December 16, 1948) was an American football player and coach. Vail played football and graduated from Germantown Academy.  He attended the University of Pennsylvania, receiving both his A.B. and his LL.B. He was a member of Delta Phi Fraternity.  Vail played football at Penn as a quarterback from 1889 to 1893. Vail also played baseball at Penn in 1891 and 1892.

Coaching career

Vail served as the fourth head football coach at the University of Illinois at Urbana–Champaign, coaching for one season in 1894 and compiling a record of 4–4. Vail coached at Case School of Applied Science for one game in 1895 before the season was cancelled.

Head coaching record

References

1870 births
1948 deaths
Case Western Spartans football coaches
Illinois Fighting Illini football coaches
Penn Quakers baseball players
Penn Quakers football players
University of Pennsylvania Law School alumni